Daniel Toscan du Plantier (7 April 1941 – 11 February 2003) was a French film producer. Educated at the Institut d'Etudes Politiques he became advertising manager for the France Soir daily newspaper in 1966 and between 1975 and 1985 was director-general of the Gaumont Film Company, and president of Unifrance, an organisation for promoting French films, from 1988 until his death.

Personal life 
Toscan du Plantier was married four times and had three sons and two daughters. His first marriage was to French actress Marie-Christine Barrault, with whom he had one son and one daughter. His second marriage was with Italian film director and producer Francesca Comencini, with whom he had one son. His third wife was Sophie Toscan du Plantier, who was murdered in 1996 (the crime is considered unsolved in Ireland, where it happened, and solved in France, where Ian Bailey was convicted in May 2019). His fourth marriage was with Melita Nikolic in 1998, with whom he had one son and one daughter.

Filmography

As producer

References

External links
 

1941 births
2003 deaths
French film producers
Burials at Père Lachaise Cemetery